This is a list of 189 species in Rhyssomatus, a genus of true weevils in the family Curculionidae.

Rhyssomatus species

 Rhyssomatus aciculaticollis Boheman, 1837 c
 Rhyssomatus acutecostatus Champion, 1904 i c
 Rhyssomatus aequalis Horn, 1873 i c b
 Rhyssomatus aethiops Kirsch, 1875 c
 Rhyssomatus alternans Champion, 1904 c
 Rhyssomatus amibinus Fiedler, 1937 c
 Rhyssomatus angustulus Faust, 1893 c
 Rhyssomatus annectans Casey, 1895 c
 Rhyssomatus annectens (Casey, 1895) i g b
 Rhyssomatus arizonicus (Van Dyke, 1930) i c
 Rhyssomatus ater Philippi, 1864 c
 Rhyssomatus aterrimus Fiedler, 1937 c
 Rhyssomatus atrolucens Fiedler, 1937 c
 Rhyssomatus atronitens Fiedler, 1937 c
 Rhyssomatus atropiceus Fiedler, 1937 c
 Rhyssomatus atrorubens Fiedler, 1937 c
 Rhyssomatus auropilosus Fiedler, 1937 c
 Rhyssomatus auroscutosus Fiedler, 1942 c
 Rhyssomatus barioides Fiedler, 1937 c
 Rhyssomatus beutenmuelleri (Van Dyke, 1930) i c
 Rhyssomatus bicolor Fiedler, 1937 c
 Rhyssomatus bicoloratus Boheman, 1845 c
 Rhyssomatus bicoloripennis Fiedler, 1937 c
 Rhyssomatus bifasciatus Fiedler, 1937 c
 Rhyssomatus biseriatus Champion, 1904 c
 Rhyssomatus brevis Fiedler, 1937 c
 Rhyssomatus breyeri Brèthes, 1910 c
 Rhyssomatus brunneipennis Fiedler, 1937 c
 Rhyssomatus brunnescens Fiedler, 1942 c
 Rhyssomatus calcarifer Fiedler, 1937 c
 Rhyssomatus canaliculatus Fiedler, 1937 c
 Rhyssomatus carbonarius Fiedler, 1939 c
 Rhyssomatus championi Blackwelder, 1947 c
 Rhyssomatus chrysocephalus Fiedler, 1937 c
 Rhyssomatus compertus Fiedler, 1937 c
 Rhyssomatus contractirostris Fiedler, 1937 c
 Rhyssomatus convexus Fiedler, 1939 c
 Rhyssomatus crassicollis Fiedler, 1937 c
 Rhyssomatus crassirostris Fiedler, 1937 c
 Rhyssomatus crenatus Champion, 1904 c
 Rhyssomatus crenulatus Blanchard, 1851 c
 Rhyssomatus crispicollis Boheman, 1837 c
 Rhyssomatus curvatirostris Fiedler, 1937 c
 Rhyssomatus debilis Champion, 1904 c
 Rhyssomatus difficilis Fiedler, 1939 c
 Rhyssomatus dilaticollis Champion, 1904 c
 Rhyssomatus discoideus Fiedler, 1939 c
 Rhyssomatus diversicollis Heller, 1921 c
 Rhyssomatus diversirostris Fiedler, 1937 c
 Rhyssomatus dumosus Kuschel, 1955 c
 Rhyssomatus ebeninus Suffrian, 1872 c
 Rhyssomatus elongatulus Fiedler, 1939 c
 Rhyssomatus erythrinus Fiedler, 1937 c
 Rhyssomatus erythropterus Fiedler, 1937 c
 Rhyssomatus exaratus Blanchard, 1851 c
 Rhyssomatus extensus Fiedler, 1939 c
 Rhyssomatus fausti Blackwelder, 1947 c
 Rhyssomatus ferruginipes Fiedler, 1937 c
 Rhyssomatus filirostris Fiedler, 1937 c
 Rhyssomatus fissilis Burke, 1961 i c b
 Rhyssomatus flavosparsus Fiedler, 1937 c
 Rhyssomatus fortirostris Fiedler, 1939 c
 Rhyssomatus fulvicornis Fiedler, 1939 c
 Rhyssomatus fulvomixtus Fiedler, 1939 c
 Rhyssomatus fulvopilosus Fiedler, 1937 c
 Rhyssomatus fulvosparsus Fiedler, 1939 c
 Rhyssomatus gracilirostris Fiedler, 1937 c
 Rhyssomatus granatensis Fiedler, 1937 c
 Rhyssomatus grandicollis (Casey, 1895) i c
 Rhyssomatus griseofasciatus Fiedler, 1939 c
 Rhyssomatus haemopterus Fiedler, 1939 c
 Rhyssomatus impolitus Fiedler, 1937 c
 Rhyssomatus impressicollis Fiedler, 1942 c
 Rhyssomatus incertus Fiedler, 1939 c
 Rhyssomatus iners Fiedler, 1939 c
 Rhyssomatus inflexirostris Fiedler, 1939 c
 Rhyssomatus landeiroi Bondar, 1942 c
 Rhyssomatus languidus Fiedler, 1937 c
 Rhyssomatus laticollis Champion, 1904 c
 Rhyssomatus latipennis Champion, 1904 c
 Rhyssomatus latovalis Fiedler, 1942 c
 Rhyssomatus latus Champion, 1904 c
 Rhyssomatus lineaticollis (Say, 1824) i c b  (milkweed stem weevil)
 Rhyssomatus lineatifrons Fiedler, 1942 c
 Rhyssomatus longirostris Chevrolat, c
 Rhyssomatus macilentus Fiedler, 1942 c
 Rhyssomatus marginatus Fåhraeus, 1837 c
 Rhyssomatus medialis (Casey, 1895) i c b
 Rhyssomatus minutus Kirsch, 1875 c
 Rhyssomatus morio Rosenschoeld, 1837 c
 Rhyssomatus nigerrimus Fåhraeus, 1837 c
 Rhyssomatus nigriventris Fiedler, 1937 c
 Rhyssomatus nigropiceus Fiedler, 1937 c
 Rhyssomatus nigrosignatus Fiedler, 1937 c
 Rhyssomatus nitidus Champion, 1904 c
 Rhyssomatus notabilis Fiedler, 1937 c
 Rhyssomatus novalis Schoenherr, 1837 c
 Rhyssomatus obliquefasciatus Fiedler, 1937 c
 Rhyssomatus oblongovalis Fiedler, 1942 c
 Rhyssomatus obtusus Fiedler, 1939 c
 Rhyssomatus ochraceus Fiedler, 1937 c
 Rhyssomatus oculatus (Schaeffer, 1909) i c
 Rhyssomatus opacus Fiedler, 1939 c
 Rhyssomatus opimus Fiedler, 1937 c
 Rhyssomatus oriformis Fiedler, 1937 c
 Rhyssomatus ovalis (Casey, 1892) i c b
 Rhyssomatus ovatulus Fiedler, 1939 c
 Rhyssomatus oviformis Fiedler, 1939 c
 Rhyssomatus ovipennis Fiedler, 1939 c
 Rhyssomatus palmacollis (Say, 1831) i c b
 Rhyssomatus parvidens Fiedler, 1942 c
 Rhyssomatus parvulus (Casey, 1895) i c b
 Rhyssomatus patinacollis  c
 Rhyssomatus paululus Fiedler, 1942 c
 Rhyssomatus perparvulus Hustache, 1936 c
 Rhyssomatus peruvianus Kirsch, 1875 c
 Rhyssomatus picinus Fiedler, 1937 c
 Rhyssomatus pilosipes Heller, 1921 c
 Rhyssomatus pilosus Kissinger, 1962 c
 Rhyssomatus pinguis Fiedler, 1937 c
 Rhyssomatus polycoccus Fåhraeus, 1837 c
 Rhyssomatus productus Fiedler, 1939 c
 Rhyssomatus pruinosus (Boheman, 1845) i c b
 Rhyssomatus psidii Marshall, 1929 c
 Rhyssomatus pubescens Horn, 1873 i c b
 Rhyssomatus pullus Hustache, 1924 c
 Rhyssomatus punctatosulcatus Champion, 1904 c
 Rhyssomatus puncticollis Champion, 1904 c
 Rhyssomatus pupillatus Suffrian, 1872 c
 Rhyssomatus pusillus Fiedler, 1937 c
 Rhyssomatus rectirostris Fiedler, 1942 c
 Rhyssomatus robustus Fiedler, 1939 c
 Rhyssomatus rubidus Fiedler, 1937 c
 Rhyssomatus rubripennis Fiedler, 1937 c
 Rhyssomatus rubrocostatus Fiedler, 1937 c
 Rhyssomatus rubrofasciatus Fiedler, 1937 c
 Rhyssomatus rubromixtus Fiedler, 1939 c
 Rhyssomatus rubropiceus Fiedler, 1939 c
 Rhyssomatus rubrovarius Fiedler, 1937 c
 Rhyssomatus rudicollis Fiedler, 1937 c
 Rhyssomatus rufescens Champion, 1904 c
 Rhyssomatus rufinus Fiedler, 1937 c
 Rhyssomatus rufipennis Kirsch, 1875 c
 Rhyssomatus rufitarsis Roelofs, 1875 c
 Rhyssomatus rufulus Fiedler, 1937 c
 Rhyssomatus rufus Fåhraeus, 1837 c
 Rhyssomatus rugosus Champion, 1904 c
 Rhyssomatus rugulipennis Champion, 1904 i c
 Rhyssomatus sculpticollis Champion, 1904 c
 Rhyssomatus sculpturatus Champion, 1904 c
 Rhyssomatus sculpturatus ? Champion, 1902-06 (0 c
 Rhyssomatus scupticollis Champion, 1902-06 (0 c
 Rhyssomatus scutellaris Fiedler, 1939 c
 Rhyssomatus semicostatus Boheman, 1845 c
 Rhyssomatus semistriatus Fiedler, 1942 c
 Rhyssomatus seriepilosus Fiedler, 1937 c
 Rhyssomatus sexcostatus Champion, 1910 c
 Rhyssomatus spectatus Faust, 1893 c
 Rhyssomatus strangulatus Gyllenhal, 1837 c
 Rhyssomatus striatellus Fiedler, 1937 c
 Rhyssomatus strigicollis Schoenherr, 1837 c
 Rhyssomatus strigosus Fiedler, 1937 c
 Rhyssomatus striolatus Fiedler, 1937 c
 Rhyssomatus subcostatus Fåhraeus, 1837 c
 Rhyssomatus subfasciatus Faust, 1893 c
 Rhyssomatus subovalis Fiedler, 1937 c
 Rhyssomatus subrhomboidalis Fiedler, 1939 c
 Rhyssomatus subrufus Champion, 1904 c
 Rhyssomatus substrigosus Fiedler, 1939 c
 Rhyssomatus subtilis Fiedler, 1937 c
 Rhyssomatus tabescens Scudder, 1893 c
 Rhyssomatus tenellus Fiedler, 1942 c
 Rhyssomatus tenuifasciatus Fiedler, 1937 c
 Rhyssomatus tenuirostris Fiedler, 1937 c
 Rhyssomatus tenuistrigatus Fiedler, 1937 c
 Rhyssomatus texanus (Sleeper, 1954) i g b
 Rhyssomatus thoracicus Fiedler, 1937 c
 Rhyssomatus tomentosus Fiedler, 1939 c
 Rhyssomatus totostriatus Fiedler, 1942 c
 Rhyssomatus trifasciatus Fiedler, 1937 c
 Rhyssomatus tuberculirostris Fiedler, 1942 c
 Rhyssomatus umbrinus Fiedler, 1937 c
 Rhyssomatus vacillatus Fiedler, 1937 c
 Rhyssomatus variegatus Fiedler, 1937 c
 Rhyssomatus variipennis Fiedler, 1937 c
 Rhyssomatus vehemens Boheman, 1845 c
 Rhyssomatus vestitus Fiedler, 1942 c
 Rhyssomatus viridipes Fåhraeus, 1837 c
 Rhyssomatus yucatanus Champion, 1904 c

Data sources: i = ITIS, c = Catalogue of Life, g = GBIF, b = Bugguide.net

References

Rhyssomatus
Articles created by Qbugbot